James Couper was a Scotland international rugby union player. He played as a Forward.

Rugby Union career

Amateur career

He played for West of Scotland.

Provincial career

Couper played for the Glasgow District in 1898.

International career

He was capped three times for Scotland between 1896-99.

References

Notes

 Bath, Richard (ed.) The Scotland Rugby Miscellany (Vision Sports Publishing Ltd, 2007 )

1873 births
1917 deaths
Scottish rugby union players
Scotland international rugby union players
West of Scotland FC players
Rugby union players from Glasgow
Glasgow District (rugby union) players
People from Erskine
Rugby union forwards